The 1972 Arizona Wildcats football team represented the University of Arizona in the Western Athletic Conference (WAC) during the 1972 NCAA University Division football season.  In their fourth and final season under head coach Bob Weber, the Wildcats compiled a 4–7 record (4–3 against WAC opponents), finished in fourth place in the WAC, and were outscored by their opponents, 271 to 226.  The team played its home games in Arizona Stadium in Tucson, Arizona.

Weber was fired after the season due to his failure to produce winning records.

The team's statistical leaders included Bill Demory with 1,175 passing yards, Bob McCall with 1,148 rushing yards, and Barry Dean with 414 receiving yards.

Schedule

After the season
Soon after losing to Arizona State, the Wildcats fired Weber and had to search for a new coach. Weber went 16–26 at Arizona and lost all four meetings against ASU. The team had been underperforming with Weber in charge and fans called for Weber to fired. Arizona did not post any winning seasons under Weber and that the inability to beat Arizona State was a main reason for his dismissal.

After a national coaching search, the Wildcats hired Michigan defensive coordinator Jim Young as the new head coach for the 1973 season.

References

Arizona
Arizona Wildcats football seasons
Arizona Wildcats football